The 1991 Pepsi Canadian Junior Curling Championships were held in Leduc, Alberta.

Men's

Teams

Standings

Results

Draw 1

Draw 2

Draw 3

Draw 4

Draw 5

Draw 6

Draw 7

Draw 8

Draw 9

Draw 10

Draw 11

Draw 13

Draw 16

Draw 18

Draw 19

Draw 21

Playoffs

Semifinal

Final

Women's

Teams

Standings

Results

Draw 1

Draw 2

Draw 3

Draw 4

Draw 5

Draw 6

Draw 7

Draw 8

Draw 9

Draw 10

Draw 12

Draw 14

Draw 15

Draw 17

Draw 20

Draw 22

Playoffs

Semifinal

Final

External links
Men's statistics
Women's statistics
Women's final (video)

Canadian Junior Curling Championships
Curling competitions in Alberta
Canadian Junior Curling Championships
1991 in Alberta
Leduc, Alberta